Mount Agepsta (Agh'aphstha) is a mountain in the Gagra Range of the Caucasus Mountains system located in Abkhazia, Georgia.

Ecology
They are in the Caucasus mixed forests ecoregion of the Temperate broadleaf and mixed forests Biome.

Higher elevations on the mountain have alpine meadows. The highest elevations near the summit have small glaciers.

See also
Mountains of the Caucasus
Mountain ranges of the Caucasus

References

Three-thousanders of the Caucasus
Mountains of Abkhazia
Mountains of Georgia (country)